Gustav Lange (1863–?) was an Estonian politician. He was a member of II Riigikogu. He was a member of the Riigikogu since 4 June 1924. He replaced Johannes Sillenberg. On 26 June 1924, he was removed from his position and he was replaced by Elise Priks.

References

1863 births
Year of death missing
Workers' United Front politicians
Members of the Riigikogu, 1923–1926